Mladá Boleslav District is a district in the Central Bohemian Region of the Czech Republic. Its capital is the city of Mladá Boleslav.

Administrative division
Mladá Boleslav District is divided into two administrative districts of municipalities with extended competence: Mladá Boleslav and Mnichovo Hradiště.

List of municipalities
Cities and towns are marked in bold and market towns in italics:

Bakov nad Jizerou -
Bělá pod Bezdězem -
Benátky nad Jizerou -
Bezno -
Bílá Hlína -
Bítouchov -
Boreč -
Boseň -
Bradlec -
Branžež -
Březina -
Březno -
Březovice -
Brodce -
Bukovno -
Čachovice -
Charvatce -
Chocnějovice -
Chotětov -
Chudíř -
Čistá -
Ctiměřice -
Dalovice -
Dlouhá Lhota -
Dobrovice -
Dobšín -
Dolní Bousov -
Dolní Krupá -
Dolní Slivno -
Dolní Stakory -
Domousnice -
Doubravička -
Horky nad Jizerou -
Horní Bukovina -
Horní Slivno -
Hrdlořezy -
Hrušov -
Husí Lhota -
Jabkenice -
Jivina -
Jizerní Vtelno -
Josefův Důl -
Katusice -
Klášter Hradiště nad Jizerou -
Kluky -
Kněžmost -
Kobylnice -
Kochánky -
Kolomuty -
Koryta -
Košátky -
Kosmonosy -
Kosořice -
Kováň -
Kovanec -
Krásná Ves -
Krnsko -
Kropáčova Vrutice -
Ledce -
Lhotky -
Lipník -
Loukov -
Loukovec -
Luštěnice -
Mečeříž -
Mladá Boleslav -
Mnichovo Hradiště -
Mohelnice nad Jizerou -
Mukařov -
Němčice -
Nemyslovice -
Nepřevázka -
Neveklovice -
Niměřice -
Nová Telib -
Nová Ves u Bakova -
Obrubce -
Obruby -
Pěčice -
Pětikozly -
Petkovy -
Písková Lhota -
Plazy -
Plužná -
Předměřice nad Jizerou -
Přepeře -
Prodašice -
Ptýrov -
Rabakov -
Rohatsko -
Rokytá -
Rokytovec -
Řepov -
Řitonice -
Sedlec -
Semčice -
Sezemice -
Skalsko -
Skorkov -
Smilovice -
Sojovice -
Sovínky -
Strašnov -
Strážiště -
Strenice -
Sudoměř -
Sukorady -
Tuřice -
Ujkovice -
Velké Všelisy -
Veselice -
Vinařice -
Vinec -
Vlkava -
Vrátno -
Všejany -
Žďár -
Zdětín -
Žerčice -
Židněves

Geography

The northern part of the district is relatively hilly, the southern part is flat. The territory extends into three geomorphological mesoregions: Jizera Table (most of the territory), Jičín Uplands (northeastern part) and Central Elbe Table (small southern part).

The most important river is the Jizera, which flows across the entire territory. Its longest tributary within the district is the Klenice.

The western part of the district is poor in streams and bodies of water, which are mostly concentrated in the eastern part of the district. The largest bodies of water are the ponds Komárovský (54 ha), Červenský (45 ha) and Žabakor (45 ha).

Bohemian Paradise is the only protected landscape area that extends into the district, in its northeastern part.

Demographics

Most populated municipalities

Economy
The largest employers with its headquarters in Mladá Boleslav District and at least 500 employers are:

Transport
The D10 motorway from Prague to Turnov passes through the district.

Sights

The most important monuments in the district, protected as national cultural monuments, are:
Mnichovo Hradiště Castle
Church of Saint Nicholas in Vinec
Secondary Industrial School in Mladá Boleslav

The best-preserved settlements, protected as monument reservations and monument zones, are:

Mužský (monument reservation)
Víska (monument reservation)
Bělá pod Bezdězem
Benátky nad Jizerou
Mladá Boleslav
Mnichovo Hradiště
Březinka
Kluky
Loukov
Skalsko
Střehom

The most visited tourist destination is the Škoda Auto Museum in Mladá Boleslav.

References

External links

Mladá Boleslav District profile on the Czech Statistical Office's website

 
Districts of the Czech Republic